The Neuroendocrine Tumor Research Foundation (NETRF), previously known as the Caring for Carcinoid Foundation (CFCF), is a nonprofit corporation organized under the laws of Massachusetts in order to support neuroendocrine and carcinoid cancer research in the public interest. The mission of NETRF is to fund research to discover cures and more effective treatments for carcinoid, pancreatic, and related neuroendocrine cancers. The specific objectives and purposes of the Foundation are to support doctors and scientists who are researching the causes of carcinoid and related neuroendocrine tumors and developing treatments; and to inform the public about research and treatments. The Foundation is accredited by the Better Business Bureau.

The Foundation was founded in 2004 by Nancy Lindholm (formerly Nancy O'Hagan), who was a carcinoid patient. It is located in Boston. On November 10, 2010, the Foundation celebrated the first annual Worldwide Neuroendocrine Tumor (NET) Cancer Awareness Day by launching their new website, which provides comprehensive information for family and friends. From time to time the Foundation makes grants available jointly with the American Association for Cancer Research. On other occasions the Foundation acts in conjunction with other grant providers or as the sole grant provider. In 2015, the organization officially changed its name to the Neuroendocrine Tumor Research Foundation and its website to www.netrf.org.

References

External links 
 Official website
 The CFCF Story

Cancer organizations based in the United States
Medical and health foundations in the United States
Medical and health organizations based in Massachusetts